Biss is a surname. Notable people with the surname include:

 Daniel Biss (born 1977), American mathematician and politician
 Jonathan Biss (born 1980), American pianist, teacher, and writer
 Eula Biss (born 1977), American non-fiction writer
 Emma Biss (born 1990), Australian cricketer